Sunni Brown is an American author in Austin, Texas known for her marketing of doodling. She is the founder Sunni Brown Ink, a visual thinking consultancy.

She is a co-author of Gamestorming: A Playbook for Innovators, Rulebreakers and Changemakers a book that outlines visual thinking techniques for business. She is also the instigator of The Doodle Revolution and author of a book called The Doodle Revolution: Unlock the Power to Think Differently.

Sunni and was named one of Fast Company’s Most Creative People in Business and Most Creative People on Twitter 2011.

References

External links
 

Living people
1977 births
Writers from Austin, Texas
American women writers
21st-century American women